The 2023 Nigerian Senate elections in Kogi State will be held on 25 February 2023, to elect the 3 federal Senators from Kogi State, one from each of the state's three senatorial districts. The elections will coincide with the 2023 presidential election, as well as other elections to the Senate and elections to the House of Representatives; with state elections being held two weeks later. Primaries were held between 4 April and 9 June 2022.

Background
In terms of the previous Senate elections, none of the three incumbent senators were returned as Ahmed Ogembe (PDP-Central) lost re-election and Isaac Alfa (PDP-East) retired from the Senate while Dino Melaye (PDP-West) initially was re-elected but lost the rerun election. In the Central district, Yakubu Oseni (APC) unseated Ogembe with 53% of the vote while Jibrin Isah (APC) won the East district with 55%. In the West district, the original election was won by Melaye but it was annulled leading to a rerun election where Smart Adeyemi (APC) took 55% to unseat Melaye. The senatorial results were an example of APC gains in the state as the party also gained several House of Representatives seats; it also won a majority in the House of Assembly and Buhari won the state in the presidential election. Later in 2019, incumbent Governor Yahaya Bello controversially won the gubernatorial election.

Overview

Summary

Kogi Central 

The Kogi Central Senatorial District covers the local government areas of Adavi, Ajaokuta, Okehi, Okene, and Ogori/Magongo. The district largely corresponds with Ebiraland, the cultural region of the Ebira people; the district also has significant non-Ebira ethnic minorities (mainly Gbagyi and Nupe peoples). Incumbent Yakubu Oseni (APC), who was elected with 52.9% of the vote in 2019, declined to seek re-election.

Primary elections

All Progressives Congress 

In late April, reports revealed that Oseni had not purchased primary forms due to Governor Yahaya Bello's endorsement of former commissioner Abubakar Sadiku Ohere for the seat. On the primary date, Ohere was nominated over Ramat Tijani Atta and Dalhatu Sheriff by a wide margin; however, both losing aspirants rejected the process and staged a walkout.

People's Democratic Party 

On the primary date, two candidates contested an indirect primary in Okene that ended with Natasha Akpoti—SDP nominee in 2019—winning the nomination after results showed her defeating Adamu Mahmoud Atta by a significant margin. Akpoti had defected from the SDP in March 2022. Although Atta contested the results, a Federal High Court dismissed his lawsuit in August and his appeal was dismissed by an Appeal Court in November.

Campaign
A few weeks after the start of the official campaign period in late September, the senate race rose to national attention due to a public spat between Akpoti and Kogi State Governor Yahaya Bello (APC). The feud began in late October when Okene Local Government Chairman Abdulrazak M. Yusuf (APC) ordered the Okene PDP office to close; sources claimed that it was an order from Bello, who wanted to hurt Akpoti's campaign in her home LGA. The state PDP rejected the order by claiming the order was an unconstitutional infringement on the right to assembly in addition to stating that a local government chairman did not have the right to shutter a building by fiat. Later that week, Bello directly entered the dispute by releasing a statement that called for Akpoti, her husband, and local PDP leaders to be questioned by security forces over alleged ties to terrorism. In response, Akpoti said she was open to questioning but requested that Bello also be invited; she also dismissed the allegations as politically-motivated as the previous APC attack line—that Akpoti was unmarried—no longer worked after her wedding in early 2022.

The contentious campaigning worsened into violence in early December when Akpoti's formal campaign commencement was attacked, injuring multiple people. The Akpoti campaign blamed Bello and the APC, accusing them of sponsoring the assailants. The next month, Akpoti received the endorsement of the Ohinoyi of Ebiraland Abdul Rahman Ado Ibrahim despite a reported threat by Bello against traditional leaders supportive of non-APC candidates. On the day prior to Election Day, the Bello administration destroyed roads leading to Akpoti's hometown in an alleged attempt to prevent INEC officials from reaching the community.

General election

Results

Kogi East 

The Kogi East Senatorial District covers the local government areas of Ankpa, Bassa, Dekina, Ibaji, Idah, Igalamela-Odolu, Ofu, Olamaboro, and Omala. The district largely corresponds with Igalaland (Anẹ Igáláà), the cultural region of the Igala people; the district also has significant non-Igala ethnic minorities (mainly Agatu, Basa-Komo, Idoma, Igala, and Igbo groups). Incumbent Jibrin Isah (APC), who was elected with 54.5% of the vote in 2019, is seeking re-election.

Primary elections

All Progressives Congress 

In the primary, Isah defeated Yahaya Audu—brother of former Governor Abubakar Audu—by a wide margin; however, Audu rejected the results as fabricated and claimed that both him and his agent were denied entry to the primary venue.

People's Democratic Party 

On the primary date, an indirect primary resulted in Victor Alewo Adoji winning the nomination after results showed him defeating runner-up Aminu Abubakar Suleiman by a significant margin.

General election

Results

Kogi West 

The Kogi West Senatorial District covers the local government areas of Ijumu, Kabba/Bunu, Kogi, Lokoja, Mopa Muro, Yagba East, and Yagba West. The district largely corresponds with Okunland, the cultural region of the Okun Yoruba subgroup; the district also has significant non-Okun minorities (mainly fellow Yoruba subgroups like the Ogori, Oworo, and Magongo subgroups along with Gbagyi and Nupe ethnicities). In the regularly scheduled 2019 election, Dino Melaye (PDP) won with 53% of the vote and was sworn in as senator in June; however, the election was annulled in August and a rerun was held in November. Smart Adeyemi (APC) was elected with 54.9% of the vote in the rerun election. Adeyemi sought re-election but lost the APC nomination.

Primary elections

All Progressives Congress 

The primary, held in Kabba, resulted in Adeyemi losing renomination to Sunday Karimi—former House of Representatives member for Yagba East/Yagba West/Mopamuro. Karimi received 288 votes compared to runner-up Aina's 73 votes and third place Adeyemi's 43 votes. The next month, Adeyemi thanked five delegates for returning his bribes; later that month, Adeyemi rejected the results while claiming that Governor Yahaya Bello tried to force him to withdraw and the primary itself was manipulated.

People's Democratic Party 

The original primary resulted in a tie between former Senator Dino Melaye and MHR Tajudeen Yusuf with Sam Aro in third position. A rerun primary was held on 24 May with only Melaye and Yusuf as candidates; Yusuf was nominated by a wide margin as Aro-supporting delegates switched to him. Melaye accepted the result and congratulated Yusuf but lamented the "gang-up" against him. Pundits viewed the primary as a proxy battle between two PDP presidential candidates as former Vice President Atiku Abubakar supported Melaye while Rivers State Governor Ezenwo Nyesom Wike backed Yusuf.

General election

Results

Notes

See also 
 2023 Nigerian Senate election
 2023 Nigerian elections

References 

Kogi State senatorial elections
2023 Kogi State elections
Kogi State Senate elections